Sarizotan (EMD-128,130) is a selective 5-HT1A receptor agonist and D2 receptor antagonist, which has antipsychotic effects, and has also shown efficacy in reducing dyskinesias resulting from long-term anti-Parkinsonian treatment with levodopa.

In June 2006, the developer Merck KGaA announced that the development of sarizotan was discontinued, after two sarizotan Phase III studies (PADDY I, PADDY II) failed to meet the primary efficacy endpoint and neither the Phase II findings nor the results from preclinical studies could be confirmed. No statistically significant difference of the primary target variable between sarizotan and placebo could be demonstrated.

See also 
 Osemozotan
 Piclozotan
 Robalzotan

References 

5-HT1A agonists
5-HT7 agonists
Abandoned drugs
Amines
D2 antagonists
Pyridines
Secondary amines
Fluoroarenes
Chromanes